Kọ́lá Túbọ̀sún is a Nigerian linguist, writer, translator, scholar, and cultural activist. His work and influence span the fields of education, language technology, literature, journalism, and linguistics. He is the recipient of the 2016 Premio Ostana "Special Prize" for Writings in the Mother Tongue. (Ostana Premio Scritture in Lingua Madre) for his work in language advocacy. He writes in Yoruba and English.

Biography
Tubosun was born in Ibadan, Nigeria in September 1981. He holds a Masters in Linguistics from Southern Illinois University Edwardsville (2012) and a BA from the University of Ibadan (2005). He also studied briefly at Moi University, Eldoret, Kenya, in April 2005, as part of a MacArthur Foundation-sponsored Socio-Cultural Exchange Program.

At the University of Ibadan, he was a campus journalist and rose to the position of president of the Union of Campus Journalists, which he led from 2002 to 2004.

In 2009, he was a Fulbright scholar, and he taught Yoruba at Southern Illinois University Edwardsville until 2010. His debut collection of poetry/travelogue Edwardsville by Heart covers this period. In 2010, while still in the US, he worked as a volunteer adult literacy tutor, with resettled immigrants, at the International Institute of St. Louis, Missouri. In 2012, he completed a master's degree in Linguistics/TESL and returned to Lagos, Nigeria to take up a job as a high school teacher of English language.

For a few years between 2015 and 2019, he worked as a linguist at Google Nigeria first as a Speech Linguistics Project Manager from 2015 to 2016, and later as a Project Manager for Natural language processing tasks in African languages in 2019.

His work of advocacy has focused on the role of African languages in today's world, especially in technology, education, literature, governance, and entertainment. He founded the Yorùbá Names Project in 2015, a lexicography project, to show how technology can help in revitalizing local languages. As a writer, he has produced work in travel writing, travel poetry, essays on literature, scholarly writings, journalism, and fiction.

From September 2019 to September 2020, he was a Chevening Fellow at the British Library in London as a Research Fellow on the Library's African language printed collection from the 19th Century.

In September 2020, he was appointed Programme Director of Yoruba Academy in Ibadan.

Linguistics, lexicography, and language advocacy
Tubosun is known for his work in linguistics, technology, and language advocacy. He has written extensively on the need to empower Nigerian languages, and Nigerian English, to function effectively in education, technology, governance, and literature. He has also engaged in projects in furtherance of these objectives.

In 2012, he led a successful campaign to have Twitter include Yoruba in the list of languages into which the platform was being translated.

In March 2015, he founded the "Yorùbá Names Project" at YorubaName.com as an effort to document all names in Yoruba in an accessible multimedia format. The project also released a free Yorùbá Keyboard software for Mac and Windows to allow its users type in Yorùbá language and Igbo on the internet.

Tubosun's team at Google Nigeria was behind the Nigerian English voice/accent on Google platforms. The voice was launched in July 2019. His collaboration at Google was helpful in getting Nigerian language diacritics into GBoard, and also correcting the mistranslation of the Esu, the Yoruba trickster god, on Google Translate. He has also worked with Google Arts & Culture on some of its exhibits in Nigeria and Kenya.

He has also worked as a consultant for Oxford English Dictionary since 2018 on Nigerian English and Yoruba entries. Some new words from Nigerian English were added to the OED in December 2019.

In 2017, he collaborated with OrishaImage to create Yorùbá Melody, a multilingual 90 minutes free Yorùbá language "audio phrasebook for Olórìṣà and cultural tourists." The audio phrasebook was released in English, Spanish, and Portuguese. In August 2019, a fourth language was added: German.

He also worked with BBC Academy to help localize the Journalistic Style Guide of the BBC into Igbo, Yoruba, and Nigerian Pidgin, ahead of its maiden broadcast in those Nigerian languages.

In honour of UNESCO's declaration of 2019 as the International Year of Indigenous Languages, Tubosun, through The YorubaName Project in collaboration with Rising Voices created @DigiAfricanLang, a twitter rotation curation account featuring scholars and professionals working in African language documentation and revitalization across the continent.

Creative and travel writing 

Tubosun has contributed to Nigerian creative writing since 2005, through poetry, travel writing, essay, prose, travel writing and literary criticism. His work has appeared in the International Literary Quarterly, Sentinel Poetry, Brittle Paper, Ake Review, Popula, NTLitMag, and Enkare Review.

He worked as the pioneering editor of a literary magazine of new writing from Nigerian and Africa called NTLitMag, from 2012 to 2015. In November 2015, he co-edited as well as Aké Review, the literary publication of the Aké Arts and Book Festival, with Kolade Arogundade. From 2015 to 2016, while he taught as a school teacher, he edited two issues of The Sail, an anthology of creative works of high school students.

Tubosun has been on the advisory board of the Aké Arts and Book Festival since July 2019.

In September 2018, he accompanied Brandon Stanton from Humans of New York as a guide while the latter was in Nigeria, an experience he later wrote about.

In 2016, he wrote the entry on Nnedi Okorafor's science fiction novel Lagoon for "Imaginary Wonderlands" (October, 2016), a collection of essays about invented worlds in literature from around the globe, from Dante to Rushdie. The book was edited by Laura Miller.

After writing an illuminating travel profile on Nobel laureate Wole Soyinka in 2018, Tubosun was awarded the 2019 Morland Writing Scholarship to write a biography of the writer, Africa's first Nobel Laureate in Literature.

Journalism 
While a student at the University of Ibadan, he was an active campus journalist. In 2002, he became the president of the Union of Campus Journalists. During his tenure, he reformed the organisation, brought the press board online, instituted formal training for campus journalists, and connected the campus organisations with many media houses in the country, who in turn opened internship roles for student journalists during their holidays. One of the recipients of the first internships was Fisayo Soyombo, then a student of agriculture, who later became a decorated journalist in Nigeria.

In 2010, he contributed to 234Next as a travel writer.

In 2015, he was nominated for the CNN African Journalists Awards for a travel piece he first published on KTravula.com, becoming the first blogger nominated for the Prize.

In 2016, after the illegal demolition of Ilojo Bar, a national monument located on Lagos Island, Tubosun wrote a three-part series in The Guardian investigating the cause and consequences of the demolition on the history of Lagos and Nigeria.

In September 2019, Tubosun co-founded The Brick House Journalism Collective, with eight other publications  with the aim of presenting independent viewpoints from all around the world. He became the founding editor-in-chief and publisher of OlongoAfrica, a literary-journalistic platform for new creative writing from Africa.

Poetry 
Tubosun writes poetry in Yoruba and English. His chapbook Attempted Speech & Other Fatherhood Poems was first published by Saraba Magazine in 2015. An earlier one Headfirst into the Meddle was published in 2005.

In 2018, his first full collection of poetry Edwardsville by Heart was published. It is a book described as "a magical meeting place of travelogue, memoir, and poetry," covering a period of three years when the author lived in the midwestern United States. It is "a quiet, reflective book", "by far a rather enjoyable read." Petero Kalulé calls him "a poet who writes so freely, so playfully, so beguilingly about the everyday and its “effing possibilities.” JM Schreiber says it has "an uncluttered vision—emotionally contained and all the more powerful as a consequence."
The book was selected as one of "Africa's Must Read Books of 2018"

His second collection of poetry, Ìgbà Èwe was published in June 2021. It has been described as "an affirmation of two or more cultures in a progressive conversation."

Literary translations 
Túbọ̀sún is currently the Africa co-editor of the inaugural edition of the Best Literary Translations Anthology, guest edited by Jane Hirshfield. It is to be published by Deep Vellum in 2024.

He is a translator of literature from and into Yoruba, his mother tongue, and has argued for more literary translations into African languages as a way of revitalizing the languages. His translation of a short story by Kenyan writer Ngũgĩ wa Thiong'o into Yoruba was published in the Jalada Language Translation project in March 2016. In 2019, his translation of a short story by Chimamanda Ngozi Adichie was published in the Absinthe Journal in 2019. He has also translated James Baldwin, Wole Soyinka, and Haruki Murakami. Since 2005, he has translated into English some of the poetry of his father, Yoruba language poet, Olatubosun Oladapo through the Poetry Translation Centre in London. One of these poems was published in Love is Not Dead by Christopher McCabe and Swirl of Words / Swirl of Worlds – Poems from 94 Languages Spoken Across Hackney.

His second collection of poetry, Ìgbà Èwe, is a bilingual collection with original Yorùbá translations of poetry by American philosopher and poet Emily Grosholz and illustrated by Yemisi Aribisala.

In 2022, he was credited as having translated the screenplay of the film adaptation of Death and the King's Horseman, a play by Wole Soyinka into Yorùbá. The film was directed by playwright Biyi Bandele and co-produced by Netflix and Ebonylife TV titled Elesin Oba, The King's Horseman. It had its world premier at the Toronto International Film Festival in September 2022, and starred Odunlade Adekola, Shaffy Bello, Brymo, Deyemi Okanlawon, Omowunmi Dada, Jide Kosoko, Kevin Ushi, Jenny Stead, Mark Elderkin, Langley Kirkwood, Taiwo Ajai-Lycett, and Joke Silva.

Awards

Premio Ostana 
In January 2016, Tubosun was chosen as a recipient of a Premio Ostana "Special Prize" for Mother Tongue Literature (Il Premio Ostana Internazionale Scritture in Lingua Madre 2016), a prize given to any individual who has done writing and notable advocacy for the defence of an indigenous language. The prize ceremony was held from 2 to 5 June 2016, in the town of Ostana (Cuneo, Italy). Tubosun was the first African to be so honoured by the organisation.

In October 2015, he was nominated for the CNN African Journalists Award for his travel piece Abeokuta's Living History, first published at KTravula.com. He was the first ever blogger on the award shortlist.

Other awards/grants/fellowships 
 2022 Imminent Innovations Grant in Language Technology
 2019 Chevening Research Fellowship to The British Library
 2018 Miles Morland Writing Scholarship
 2017 Ventures Africa "40 Under 40" Innovators for 2017.
 2017 Saraba Magazine Manuscript Contest
 2016 100 most innovative people in technology by YNaija
2016 Quartz African Innovator's List.
 2015 Nigeria's most innovative people in technology by YNaija

Selected works
Poetry

 Ìgbà Èwe (ISBN 9789789907014) Ouida Books, Lagos. 2021.
Edwardsville by Heart Wisdom's Bottom Press, UK, 2018
 Attempted Speech and Other Fatherhood Poems (Poetry Chapbook) Saraba Magazine, 2015.

Edited

 Edo North: Field Studies of the Languages and Lands of the Northern Edo (Ed., 2011). Essays in Honour of Professor Ben O. Elugbe. Zenith Book House.
NTLitMag: 29 Issues (2012-2015)

Personal life 
His father Olatubosun Oladapo, was a poet and journalist. His sister, Yemi Adesanya, is an accountant and author. His wife, Temie Giwa founded LifeBank, a health logistics company. His niece, Adeola, is the first daughter of the 51st Ooni of Ife. He lives in Lagos, Nigeria.

See also
 List of Nigerian bloggers

References

External links
 
 "A Father's Apprehensions and Fascinations: An Interview"
 "Yoruba & Esperanto are now open for translation in the Twitter Translation Centre"
 "A Multimedia Dictionary of Yorùbá Names", YorubaName.com.
 "Ideas of Identity", Writing a New Nigeria, BBC Radio 4. 
 Kola Tubosun's Travel Blog

1981 births
Living people
21st-century Nigerian educators
21st-century Nigerian poets
21st-century Nigerian writers
21st-century translators
English-language writers from Nigeria
English–Yoruba translators
Google employees
Linguists from Nigeria
Male bloggers
Nigerian bloggers
Nigerian editors
Nigerian journalists
Nigerian male poets
Nigerian schoolteachers
Nigerian travel writers
Olatubosun Oladapo family
Southern Illinois University Edwardsville alumni
University of Ibadan alumni
Writers from Ibadan
Yoruba academics
Yoruba educators
Yoruba writers
Yoruba–English translators
Yoruba-language writers
Fulbright alumni